Seeberg is a municipality in the Oberaargau administrative district in the canton of Bern in Switzerland. The lake Burgäschisee is located on the border with Aeschi.  On 1 January 2016 the former municipality of Hermiswil merged into Seeberg.

History

Hermiswil
Hermiswil is first mentioned in 1289 as Hermanswile.

During the 13th and 14th Centuries, the Hermiswil area had been granted by the Kyburg family to the vom Stein family.  In 1466 the city of Solothurn inherited all the vom Stein holdings, which included Hermiswil.  Following the Wyniger Vertrag, of  1665, the village was given to Bern.  It was placed under the authority for low justice from Bollodingen and administered by the Landvogtei of Wangen.  The Roman Catholic citizens of Hermiswil were placed under the guidance of the Reformed parish of Herzogenbuchsee.

While the village is located along two transportation routes (the road from Bern into the Aargau, and since 1857 the rail line from Olten to Bern) it has remained a small farming community.

Oschwand
Painter Cuno Amiet lived the second part of his life in this hamlet of Seeberg. He died there.

Geography
Of this area, 58.8% is used for agricultural purposes, while 34% is forested. Of the rest of the land, 6.5% is settled (buildings or roads) and the remainder (0.7%) is non-productive (rivers, glaciers or mountains).

Demographics
, 2.0% of the population was made up of foreign nationals. Over the last 10 years the population has decreased at a rate of -2.4%. Most of the population speaks German  (97.5%), with Turkish being second most common ( 0.7%) and French being third ( 0.5%).

In the 2007 election the most popular party was the SVP which received 49.6% of the vote.  The next three most popular parties were the SPS (14.5%), the Green Party (8.9%) and the FDP (8.7%).

 
The age distribution of the population is children and teenagers (0–19 years old) make up 27% of the population, while adults (20–64 years old) make up 58.3% and seniors (over 64 years old) make up 14.7%.  In Seeberg about 77.1% of the population (between age 25-64) have completed either non-mandatory upper secondary education or additional higher education (either university or a Fachhochschule).

Seeberg has an unemployment rate of 0.69%.  , there were 157 people employed in the primary economic sector and about 59 businesses involved in this sector.  77 people are employed in the secondary sector and there are 21 businesses in this sector.  138 people are employed in the tertiary sector, with 34 businesses in this sector.

References

External links

Municipalities of the canton of Bern